Yeni Eskihisar is a late Miocene formation in Yatağan, Muğla Province, Turkey. It is well known for its pollen studies.

Vertebrate paleofauna 
 Thalassictis montadai (Mammalia, Carnivora, Hyaenidae)
 Proticititherium cingulatum (Mammalia, Carnovira, Hyaenidae)
 Peruniinae (Mammalia, Carnivora, Mustelidae)
 Miamachairodus (Mammalia, Carnivora, Felidae)

References 

Geology of Turkey
Neogene System of Asia
Miocene Series
Paleontology in Turkey
Formations